The Convair P6Y was an unbuilt aircraft designed by Convair in the 1950s. The design was initiated to meet a requirement of the United States Navy (USN) for an anti-submarine warfare seaplane.

History 

The design was for a flying boat that would make use of boundary layer control to achieve slow speed flight. It was intended that this would enable the aircraft to land on the open ocean in rough seas and deploy a dipping sonar. Other visual features of the design were an extremely large swept vertical fin that, combined with the dorsal fin and rudder, would have been about half the total length of the aircraft, and a thimble nose radome.

Two prototypes were ordered under the USN designation XP6Y-1 with the BuNos. (Navy serial numbers) 147206 and 147207. The design had competition from the Martin P7M SubMaster, but the USN's preference was for the P6Y. Both types suffered from budget constraints and neither was built (although a mock-up of the P7M was constructed); the USN cancelled the contract for the two prototype XP6Y-1s and later opted for the land-based P-3 Orion instead.

Specifications (projected)

See also

References

P6Y
Trimotors
Aircraft with auxiliary jet engines
Cancelled military aircraft projects of the United States
Flying boats
Parasol-wing aircraft